Division No. 17, Unorganized is a Statistics Canada census subdivision of its Division No. 17, Manitoba, that consists of a part of the division that is not organized into either incorporated municipalities or Indian reserves.

Geography
According to Statistics Canada, the census subdivision has a population of 101 (in 2011) and an area of 2,169.59 km2.

See also
Riding Mountain National Park

References

Unorganized areas in Manitoba
Populated places in Parkland Region, Manitoba